Philip "Phil" G. Hogan (born 10 October 1954) is an English sports therapist, and former professional rugby league footballer who played in the 1970s, 1980s and 1990s. Followong retirement from rugby Phil started his own gym in his local town before later moving into coaching at local rugby union club Furness Rugby Club. Whilst coaching Phil helped develop many local rugby talents that went on to represent the county including players such as Philip Brockbank and Corne Els.

Background
Phil Hogan was born and raised in Barrow-in-Furness, Lancashire, England.  Younger brother of Steve Hogan whose outstanding contributions to the Barrow team led to the coach giving Phil his chance for the 1st team at age 15 in the hopes he would be as good as Steve.

Playing career

1977-1979 Great Britain International

1979 Great Britain Lions Tour of Australia & New Zealand 

1977 World Cup Finalist

1978 World Record Transfer Fee (Barrow to Hull KR)

1979 England International

1983/84,1984/85 RL Championship Winner

1979/80 RL Challenge Cup Winner

1980/81 RL Premiership Winner (Try scorer in the final) 

1984/85 John Player Trophy Winner (Try scorer in the final) 

1985/86 Yorkshire Cup Winner

International honours
Phil Hogan won a cap for England while at Hull Kingston Rovers in 1979 against France, and won caps for Great Britain while at Barrow in the 1977 Rugby League World Cup against France, New Zealand, and Australia (2 matches), in 1978 against Australia (sub), while at Hull Kingston Rovers in 1979 against Australia, Australia (sub), New Zealand, and New Zealand (sub).

Challenge Cup Final appearances
Phil Hogan was an interchange/substitute in Hull Kingston Rovers' 10–5 victory over Hull F.C. in the 1979–80 Challenge Cup Final during the 1979–80 season at Wembley Stadium, London on Saturday 3 May 1980, in front of a crowd of 95,000, and played left-, i.e. number 4, in the 9–18 defeat by Widnes in the 1980–81 Challenge Cup Final during the 1980–81 season at Wembley Stadium, London on Saturday 2 May 1981, in front of a crowd of 92,496.

County Cup Final appearances
Phil Hogan played left-, i.e. number 4, and scored 2-goals in Hull Kingston Rovers' 7–8 defeat by Leeds in the 1980–81 Yorkshire County Cup Final during the 1979–80 season at Fartown Ground, Huddersfield on Saturday 8 November 1980, and played right-, i.e. number 12, (replaced by interchange/substitute Andy Kelly) in the 22–18 victory over Castleford in the 1985–86 Yorkshire County Cup Final during the 1985–86 season at Headingley Rugby Stadium, Leeds on Sunday 27 October 1985.

Premiership Trophy Final appearances

Phil Hogan played left-, i.e. number 4, in and scored a try Hull Kingston Rovers' 11–7 victory over Hull F.C. in the Premiership Final during the 1980–81 season at Headingley Rugby Stadium, Leeds on Saturday 16 May 1981.

BBC2 Floodlit Trophy Final appearances
Phil Hogan played  in Hull Kingston Rovers' 3–13 defeat by Hull F.C. in the 1979 BBC2 Floodlit Trophy Final during the 1979–80 season at The Boulevard, Hull on Tuesday 18 December 1979.

John Player/John Player Special Trophy Final appearances
Phil Hogan played left-, i.e. number 4, in Hull Kingston Rovers' 4–12 defeat by Hull F.C. in the 1981–82 John Player Trophy Final during the 1981–82 season at Headingley Rugby Stadium, Leeds on Saturday 23 January 1982, and played right-, i.e. number 12, and scored a try in the 12–0 victory over Hull F.C. in the 1984–85 John Player Special Trophy Final during the 1984–85 season at Boothferry Park, Kingston upon Hull on Saturday 26 January 1985.

Club career
Phil Hogan was transferred from Barrow to Hull Kingston Rovers in 1978 for a then world record fee of £33,000 (based on increases in average earnings, this would be approximately £249,700 in 2013).

References

External links
(archived by web.archive.org) Back on the Wembley trail
(archived by web.archive.org) Barrow RL’s great Britons

1954 births
Living people
Barrow Raiders players
England national rugby league team players
English rugby league players
Great Britain national rugby league team players
Hull Kingston Rovers players
Rugby league locks
Rugby league second-rows
Rugby league players from Barrow-in-Furness